Lucius Richard Dorsey (October 15, 1921 – date of death unknown) was an American baseball left fielder in the Negro leagues. He played with the Philadelphia Stars in 1941 and the Newark Eagles in 1942.

References

External links
 and Seamheads

Newark Eagles players
Philadelphia Stars players
1921 births
Year of death unknown
People from Bulloch County, Georgia
Baseball players from Georgia (U.S. state)
Baseball outfielders